Kartir, the great and influential Sasanian priest, has left an inscription in Naqsh-e Rajab in the Chamgan mountain. The inscription is located about one kilometer away from the south of ancient Istakhr city, and about three kilometers away from the north of Takht-e Jamshid. In Naqsh-e Rajab, there are also some figures of Ardashir I and Shapur I. Kartir's inscription is incised next to another inscription that shows Ahura Mazda appointing Ardashir I as the Shahanshah of Ērānshahr. Kartir is the only non-king person who was granted the right to have an inscription.

Kartir's inscription contains 31 lines in Middle Persian and in the left side of it, a portrait of Kartir himself is incised. The text introduces Kartir and briefly describes his ascent (Kardegān). Kartir also has two other inscriptions in Naqsh-e Rostam and Sarmashhad that describe his ascent in more detail. He wants the reader to follow the path of Ahura Mazda like him and briefly lists his deeds, like building fire temples and devoting property to other Mobads. He then lists his titles in the Sasanian court: "mobad and herbad" in the time of Shapour I, "Kartir, the mobad of Hormozd" in the time of Hormozd I and Bahram I, and "Mobad Kartir whom Bahram and Hormozd saved his soul" at the time of Bahram II. This part is described in more details in 3 other inscriptions he has left behind. At the end, he mentions a certain "Bōxtag" as his "dabir" (scribe).

Unfortunately, the word "Mowbadan Mowbed" was vandalized in the inscription.

References

Sources 

Sasanian inscriptions
3rd-century inscriptions
Rock reliefs in Iran